Samuel Giani Zimța (born 23 May 2000) is a Romanian professional footballer who plays as a left midfielder.

Club career

Zimbru Chișinău
He made his league debut on 12 March 2022 in Moldovan National Division match against FC Bălți.

Honours
FC U Craiova 1948
Liga II: 2020–21
Liga III: 2019–20

Notes

References

External links
 

2000 births
Living people
Romanian footballers
Romania youth international footballers
Association football midfielders
Romanian expatriate footballers
Romanian expatriate sportspeople in Italy
Moldovan Super Liga players
Liga II players
Liga III players
FC U Craiova 1948 players
FC Zimbru Chișinău players
FC Ripensia Timișoara players